Banarjhula  is a village development committee in Saptari District in the Sagarmatha Zone of south-eastern Nepal. At the time of the 2011 Nepal census it had a population of 4424 people living in 859 individual households. It includes the village of Kanchira.

References

Populated places in Saptari District
VDCs in Saptari District